This is a list of lighthouses in Lithuania.

Baltic Sea lighthouses
The following lighthouses lie on or near the Baltic Sea.

Curonian Lagoon lighthouses 
The following lighthouses lie within the fresh water Curonian Lagoon.

Notes

See also
 Lists of lighthouses and lightvessels

External links

 

Lithuania
Lighthouses
Lighthouses